Lucas Matthew Beech (born January 20, 1972) is a professional baseball player. He played in Major League Baseball with the Philadelphia Phillies from 1996 to 1998.

In 2005, Beech played for the Erie SeaWolves of the Eastern League. As an independent league player in 2007 for the Bridgeport Bluefish, Beech was attacked with a bat by José Offerman during a game in which Beech was pitching to Offerman. Beech had hit Offerman with a pitch causing him to charge the mound with his bat. Catcher John Nathans was hit in the head and sustained a concussion. Beech's finger was broken during this incident.

References

External links

Matt Beech at Baseball Almanac
Matt Beech at Pura Pelota (Venezuelan Professional Baseball League)

1972 births
Águilas del Zulia players
Baseball players from Oakland, California
Batavia Clippers players
Bravos de Margarita players
Bridgeport Bluefish players
Chattanooga Lookouts players
Clearwater Phillies players
Columbus Clippers players
Erie SeaWolves players
Houston Cougars baseball players
Leones del Caracas players
American expatriate baseball players in Venezuela
Living people
Long Island Ducks players
Major League Baseball pitchers
Norwich Navigators players
Oklahoma RedHawks players
Pawtucket Red Sox players
Philadelphia Phillies players
Charlotte Rangers players
Reading Phillies players
Rimini Baseball Club players
American expatriate baseball players in Italy
Scranton/Wilkes-Barre Red Barons players
Spartanburg Phillies players
Tulsa Drillers players